The Wild Card Series (formerly known as Wild Card Game from 2012 to 2019 and in 2021) are games that serve as the opening round of the Major League Baseball (MLB) postseason. A single wild card game was first instituted in 2012; best-of-three playoff wild card series were adopted for the 2022 season.

Under the current playoff structure, there are two series in both the American League (AL) and National League (NL). The lowest-seeded division winner and three wild card teams in each league play in a best-of-three series after the end of the regular season. The winners of each league's wild card rounds advance to face the top two division winners in that league's Division Series. This expansion of the postseason also abolished any regular season extending tie-breaker games.

Format
Under the format adopted in 2022, six teams in each league are assigned seeds for the postseason. In each league, the three division winners are the top three seeds and are always assigned seeds #1–3, per their relative winning percentages. The worst division winner is automatically the No. 3 seed regardless of whether one or all of the other wild-card teams has a better record. The wild cards in each league are the three teams with the best winning percentages among non-division winning teams and are assigned seeds #4–6, per their relative winning percentages. Any ties are broken using MLB tie-breaking procedures, no tie-breaking games (colloquially known as "Game 163") are contested.

The top two seeds in each league receive first-round byes to the Division Series. The remaining four teams, seeds No. 3 through No. 6, play in two best-of-3 wild card series, with the higher seed hosting all games. These two series are: No. 3 hosting No. 6, and No. 4 hosting No. 5.

In the Division Series, the winner of the No. 4 vs. No. 5 series faces the No. 1 seed, and the winner of the No. 3. vs. No. 6 series faces the No. 2 seed. The bracket structure in each league looks as follows:

History
The Wild Card round was initially introduced in 2012 as a single-game playoff between two wild-card teams in each league, with the winner advancing to the Division Series. With the adoption of MLB's new collective bargaining agreement in November 2011, baseball commissioner Bud Selig announced that a new playoff system would begin within the next two years; the change was ultimately put into place in 2012. This format was used through the 2019 season.

For the 2020 postseason, following a shortened 60-game regular season due to the COVID-19 pandemic, MLB held Wild Card Series with eight teams in each league, thus a total of 16 playoff teams. Division champions were seeded 1–3 by record, the second-place teams seeded 4–6 by record, and the two teams with the next-best records were seeded seventh and eighth. Matchups were contested as best-of-three series rather than individual games. MLB returned to the previous format of one Wild Card Game per league for the 2021 postseason, before it changed to two best-of-three Wild Card series per league the next year.

As of the beginning of the 2021 postseason, 26 of the 30 MLB franchises have reached the Wild Card round of the postseason (either a Wild Card Game or the 2020 Wild Card Series). The New York Yankees have the most appearances with five. The Yankees and the Tampa Bay Rays have the most wins during the Wild Card round with three each. The Oakland Athletics have the most losses during the Wild Card round, having lost three of their four appearances.

Through the 2021 postseason, Wild Card Game winners have gone on to compile an overall 9–9 record in League Division Series, with Wild Card Game winners going 4–5 in the ALDS and 5–4 in the NLDS. Two Wild Card Game winners have gone on to win the World Series (the 2014 Giants and the 2019 Nationals). The 2014 postseason featured the first series sweeps involving a Wild Card Game winner; both in favor of the AL Wild Card Kansas City Royals, who swept the Los Angeles Angels in the ALDS and the Baltimore Orioles in the ALCS. The Royals then met the San Francisco Giants in the 2014 World Series, the second all-Wild Card fall classic, which the Giants won in seven games. The first all-Wild Card World Series had also involved the Giants, who lost the 2002 World Series to the then-Anaheim Angels in seven games.

In the sixteen games played since the new Wild Card system began in 2012, five have been shutouts. In eight of the eleven others, the losing team scored three or fewer runs. Only the 2014 AL Wild Card game between the Kansas City Royals and Oakland Athletics and the 2017 NL Wild Card game between the Colorado Rockies and the Arizona Diamondbacks featured high scoring by both teams, with the Royals eventually winning 9–8 in 12 innings and the Diamondbacks winning 11–8 with the most runs scored in a Wild Card game. The margin of victory has been four runs or more in eight of the sixteen games played, and one run only three times—in the 2014 Royals-Athletics game, the 2018 Rockies-Cubs game, and the 2019 Nationals-Brewers game.

Results
Through the 2021 postseason, visiting teams and home teams have each won nine of the 18 games played. There have been five shutouts, each of which has been won by the visiting team, including three consecutive shutouts in the 2014–2016 NL editions. Two of the three extra innings games have been won by the home team. Three games have ended in walk-off victory for the home team, with the 2021 NL edition being the only one in regulation.

American League Wild Card Game

National League Wild Card Game

Wild Card Series
Eight teams from each league participated: three division winners, three division runners-up, and two wild card teams (the two remaining teams with the best records, based on winning percentage). Thus, while each league's Wild Card Series featured a total of eight teams, there were still only two wild card qualifiers per league.

Starting in 2022, a modified version of the Wild Card Series was used. However, only three Wild Cards qualify along with the lowest-seeded division winner.

American League Wild Card Series

National League Wild Card Series

Appearances by team
In the sortable tables below, teams are ordered first by number of wins, then by number of appearances, and finally by year of first appearance. These records reflect series outcomes of the 2020 Wild Card Series, not individual games. In the "Season(s)" column, bold years indicate winning appearances.

American League

National League

Game results by team
Updated through the 2022 postseason. These records reflect individual game results of the 2020 Wild Card Series.

The following current MLB teams have not yet appeared in a Wild Card playoff:
American League: Detroit Tigers, Los Angeles Angels

Records
Single team
 Most runs scored: 12, New York Yankees vs. Cleveland Indians, Game 1 of the 2020 ALWC
 Most hits: 17, Arizona Diamondbacks vs. Colorado Rockies, 2017 NLWC

Both teams
 Most runs scored: 20, St. Louis Cardinals (9) vs. San Diego Padres (11), Game 1 of the 2020 NLWC
 Most hits: 30, Colorado Rockies (13) vs. Arizona Diamondbacks (17), 2017 NLWC

Other
Largest run differential: 9, New York Yankees (12) vs. Cleveland Indians (3), Game 1 of the 2020 ALWC
Longest game, by time: 297 minutes (4:57), Tampa Bay Rays vs. Cleveland Guardians, Game 2 of the 2022 ALWCS
Longest game, by innings: 15, Tampa Bay Rays vs. Cleveland Guardians, Game 2 of the 2022 ALWCS

See also

 List of Major League Baseball Wild Card Round broadcasters

Notes

References

Major League Baseball postseason
Recurring sporting events established in 2012
October sporting events
2012 establishments in North America
Annual events in Major League Baseball